The Yakovlev UT-2 (NATO reporting name "Mink") was a single-engine tandem two-seat low-wing monoplane that was the standard Soviet trainer during the Great Patriotic War. It was used by the Soviet Air Force from 1937 until replaced by the Yakovlev Yak-18 during the 1950s.

Development
The preceding U-2 (Po-2) biplane was no longer a suitable trainer for the faster modern aircraft entering service, and to fill the role, the UT-2 was designed as a trainer.

The new aircraft was designed by Alexander Sergeevich Yakovlev's team at OKB-115. Originally designated AIR-10, it was based upon the AIR-9, but it was simpler, with tandem open cockpits, also omitting slats and flaps. It first flew on 11 July 1935. The AIR-10 won the competition in 1935 and, after minor changes, was accepted as the standard Soviet Air Force trainer. With the disgrace of Alexey Ivanovich Rykov under whom Yakovlev had been working, the initials AIR were replaced with Ya making what would have been the AIR-20 the Ya-20 (Я-20).

The wood-and-metal mixed construction of the AIR-10 was simplified to use only wood to facilitate production, and the AIR-10s 120 hp Renault inline engine was replaced with the 112 kW (150 hp) Shvetsov M-11E radial on the prototype, and the 82 kW (110 hp) M-11Gs in early production aircraft. Serial production started in September 1937. The Soviet VVS (Air Force) assigned the aircraft the designation UT-2 (uchebno-trenirovochnyi {учебно-тренировочный}, trainer).

The UT-2 was not easy to fly and easily entered into spins. The UT-2 model 1940 featured a lengthened forward fuselage, and a change to the 93 kW (125 hp) M-11D radial to attempt to rectify the problem. Despite improvements, the handling and flight characteristics remained challenging.

To further improve handling and stability, the new UT-2M (modernized) variant was developed in 1941 and it replaced the original UT-2 in production. The wing planform was redesigned, with a swept leading edge and a straight trailing edge, and the vertical stabilizer was enlarged.

7,243 UT-2 of all types were produced in five factories between 1937 and 1946. 
In the 1950s, the UT-2 was replaced by the Yak-18 primary trainer and the Yak-11 advanced trainer.

Before and after World War II the UT-2 was used by civilian organizations, and after the war, UT-2s were also operated by the Polish and Hungarian Air Forces.

Variants

AIR-10precursor
Ya-20prototype
UT-2initial production variant
UT-2 (1940 standard)improved spin characteristics.
UT-2 (1944 standard)UT-2L
UT-2 with MV-4inline engine for tests.
UT-2Limproved 1940 standard with canopy and engine cowling, fuselage similar to early Yak-18 but had fixed undercarriage.
UT-2Mproduction from 1941, new wings and empennage
UT-2MVinterim light bomber
UT-2N (SEN)air cushion landing gear testbed
UT-2Vbomber trainer
VT-2floatplane variant of basic UT-2
Yak-5single-seat fighter-trainer development of UT-2L

Operators

Normandie-Niemen unit

Hungarian Air Force

Air Force of the Polish Army
Polish Navy

Mongolian People's Air Force

Romanian Air Force

Soviet Air Force

SFR Yugoslav Air Force
1st Training Aviation Regiment (1945-1948)
104th Training Aviation Regiment (1948-1956)
Liaison Squadron of 5th Military district (1952-1956)
Liaison Squadron of 3rd Aviation Corps (1950-1956)
Letalski center Maribor

Survivors
The Central Air Force Museum at Monino has an example on display, as does the Technical Museum of Vadim Zadorogny near the Arkhangelskoye Palace, and the Nikola Tesla Technical Museum in Zagreb, Croatia.

Specifications (UT-2, 1940 standard)

See also

References

Further reading
 
 

UT-2
1930s Soviet military trainer aircraft
Single-engined tractor aircraft
Low-wing aircraft
Aircraft first flown in 1937